Neighborhoods of Vilnius are administrative districts of Vilnius City Municipality.

List
Elderships, a statewide administrative division, function as municipal districts. The 21 elderships are based on neighbourhoods:

References

External links

  Official site of the Vilnius City Municipality

Neighbourhoods in Lithuania